Colby most often refers to:
 Colby (given name), a list of people
 Colby (surname), a list of people
 Colby cheese (originally 'Colby Cheddar'), a type of cheese made from cow's milk
 Colby-Jack, a mixture of Colby and Monterey Jack cheeses

Colby may also refer to:

Places

Europe 
 Colby, Cumbria, UK
 Colby, Norfolk, UK
 Colby Woodland Garden, Pembrokeshire, UK
 Colby, Isle of Man

United States 
 Colby, Kansas, a city in Kansas
 Colby, Ohio, an unincorporated community
 Colby, Wisconsin, a city in Wisconsin
 Colby (town), Wisconsin, a town in Clark County
 South Colby, Washington, an unincorporated community
 Colby College, a liberal arts college located in Waterville, Maine

Geography 
 Colby Lake (Chisago County, Minnesota)
 Colby Lake (Washington County, Minnesota)
 Colby Mountain (Tuolumne County, California)

Culture 
 Colby, a Franco-Belgian comic series from Michel Blanc-Dumont and Greg

Television 
 The Colbys, the TV series, aired from 1985 until 1987 on ABC
 Colby's Clubhouse, the Christian TV series, aired from 1984 until 2000 on Trinity Broadcasting Network

Other uses 
 Colby, the ball in Bando (sport)
 Colby Nolan, a cat
 The Colby meteorite of 1917, which fell in Wisconsin, United States (see meteorite falls)

See also 
 Colby High School (disambiguation)
 Cobe (disambiguation)
 Coby (disambiguation)
 Colbie
 Kobe (disambiguation)
 Kobi (disambiguation)
Kolby, place in Denmark